Peter Arnold Cronjé (21 September 1949 – 4 September 2020) was a South African rugby union player.

Playing career

He toured with the Springboks to Australia in 1971 and played in all three test matches. In 1972 he toured with the Gazelles, a South African under 24 team to Argentina. He then played in the last two test matches in the series against the 1974 British Lions, scoring his third test try in the final test against the Lions. Cronjé also played in eight tour matches, scoring two tries.

Test history

See also

List of South Africa national rugby union players – Springbok no. 447

References

1949 births
2020 deaths
Afrikaner people
South African rugby union players
South Africa international rugby union players
Golden Lions players
Alumni of Parktown Boys' High School
Rugby union players from Johannesburg
Rugby union centres